Kabylia (Kabyle: Tamurt n Leqbayel or Iqbayliyen, meaning "Land of Kabyles", meaning "Land of the Tribes") is a cultural, natural and historical region in northern Algeria and the homeland of the Kabyle people. It is part of the Tell Atlas mountain range and is located at the edge of the Mediterranean Sea.

Kabylia covers two provinces of Algeria: Tizi Ouzou and Bejaia. Gouraya National Park and Djurdjura National Park are also located in Kabylia.

History

Antiquity
Kabylia was a part of the Kingdom of Numidia (202 BC – 46 BC).

List of Empires/Dynasties created by the Kabyle people 
 Zirid Dynasty
 Hammadid Dynasty
 Fatimid Caliphate
 Taifa of Alpuente
 Taifa of Granada
 Kingdom of Beni Abbes
 Kingdom of Kuku

Middle Ages
The history of Kabylie started to appear in the classical books during the fourth century AD with the revolt of the commander Firmus and his brother Guildon against the empire.

The Vandals, a Germanic people, established a kingdom in North Africa in 435. They were conquered by the Byzantine Empire shortly after. During the rule of the Romans, Vandals and Byzantines, the Kabyle people were some of the few Imazighen in North Africa who remained independent. The Kabyle people were so resistant that even during the Arab conquest of North Africa they still had control and possession over their mountains. In fact it was not until 1857 that Kabylia as a whole was fully and entirely conquered and subdued.

Between 902 and 909 AD the Fatimid state was founded by the Kutama Berbers from Little Kabylie, whose conquest of Ifriqiya resulted in the creation of the Caliphate. After the conquest of Ifriqiya the Kutama Berbers conquered the realm of the Rustamids on the way to Sijilmasa which they also briefly conquered. There the imprisoned Abdullāh al-Mahdī Billa was freed, accepted as the Imam of the movement, and installed as the first Caliph and founder of the ruling dynasty. The historian Heinz Halm describes the early Fatimid state as being "a hegemony of the Kutama and Sanhaja Berbers over the eastern and central Maghrib" and Prof. Dr. Loimeier states that rebellions against the Fatimids were also expressed through protest and opposition to Kutama rule. The weakening of the Abbasids allowed Fatimid-Kutama power to quickly expand and in 959 Ziri ibn Manad, Jawhar the Sicilian and a Kutama army conquered Fez and Sijilmassa in Morocco. 
 In 969 under the command of Jawhar, the Fatimid Kutama troops conquered Egypt from the Ikhsidids, the Kutama Berber general Ja'far ibn Fallah was instrumental in this success: he led the troops that crossed the river Nile and according to al-Maqrizi, captured the boats used to do this from a fleet sent by Ikhshidid loyalists from Lower Egypt. The Kutama general Ja’far then invaded Palestine and conquered Ramla, the capital, he then conquered Damascus and made himself the master of the city and then he moved north and conquered Tripoli. It was around this time period that the Fatimid Caliphate reached its territorial peak of 4,100,000 km2.

A Berber family emerged as formidable leaders in the unique Berber form of elected delegates form of government (through financial contribution and thus influence), the Zirids. Beyond their immediate Zirid territory (aarch/Congregation), another aarch and family Hammadid and its associates emerged in Kabylia with influence covering most of today's Algeria, whereas the Zirid's territory extended eastward to cover the area of modern Tunisia. Both the Hammadid and Zirid empires as well as the Fatimids established their rule in the Maghreb countries. The Zirids ruled land in what is now Algeria, Tunisia, Morocco, Libya, Spain, Malta and Italy. The Hammadids captured and held important regions such as Ouargla, Constantine, Sfax, Susa, Algiers, Tripoli and Fez establishing their rule in every country in the Maghreb region. The Fatimids conquered all of North Africa as well as Sicily and parts of the Middle East.

Regency of Algiers
During the Regency of Algiers, most of Kabylia was independent. Kabylia was split into two main kingdoms, the Kingdom of Kuku in modern Tizi Ouzou, and the Kingdom of Ait Abbas in modern Béjaïa.

French colonisation and resistance

Though the region was the last stronghold against French colonization, the area was gradually taken over by the French after 1830, despite vigorous local resistance by the local population led by leaders such as Faḍma n Sumer and Cheikh Mokrani, until the Battle of Icheriden in 1857 marked a decisive French victory, with sporadic outbursts of violence continuing as late as Mokrani's rebellion in 1871. Much land was confiscated in this period from the more recalcitrant tribes and given to French pieds-noirs. Many arrests and deportations were carried out by the French in response to uprisings, mainly to New Caledonia (hence the origins of the Algerians of the Pacific.) Colonization also resulted in an acceleration of the emigration into other areas of the country and outside of it.

Algerian migrant workers in France organized the first party promoting independence in the 1920s. Messali Hadj, Imache Amar, Si Djilani, and Belkacem Radjef rapidly built a strong following throughout France and Algeria in the 1930s and actively trained militants who became key players during the struggle for independence and in building an independent Algerian state.

In the Algerian War 
During the War of Independence (1954–1962), the FLN and ALN's reorganisation of the country created, for the first time, a unified Kabyle administrative territory, wilaya III, being as it was at the centre of the anti-colonial struggle. As such, along with the Aurès, it was one of the most affected areas because of the importance of the maquis (aided by the mountainous terrain) and the high levels of support and collaboration of its inhabitants for the nationalist cause. Several historic leaders of the FLN came from this region, including Hocine Aït Ahmed, Abane Ramdane, and Krim Belkacem. It was also in Kabylia that the Soummam conference took place in 1956, the first of the FLN. The flipside of being such a critical region for the independence movement was being one of the major target of French counter-insurgency operations, not least the devastation of agricultural lands, lotting, destruction of villages, population displacement, the creation of forbidden zones, etc.

After independence 

From the moment of independence, tensions had already developed between Kabyle leaders and the central government, with the Socialist Forces Front (FFS) party of Hocine Aït Ahmed, strong in wilayas III and IV (Kabylie and Algiers), opposing the FLN's Political Bureau centred around the person of Ahmed Ben Bella, who in turn relied upon the forces of the border army group within the ALN commanded by Houari Boumediene. As early as 1963 the FFS called into question the authority of the single-party system, which resulted in two years of armed confrontation in the region, leaving more than four hundred dead, and most of the FLN leaders from Kabylia and the eastern provinces either executed or forced into exile.

In April 1980, following the banning of a conference by writer Mouloud Mammeri on traditional Kabyle poetry, riots and strikes broke out in Tizi Ouzou, followed by several months of demonstrations on university campuses in Kabylia and Algiers, known as the Berber Spring, demanding the officialisation and recognition of the Tamazight language. These resulted in the extrajudicial imprisonment of thousands of Kabylie intellectuals, along with other clashes in Tizi-Ouzou and Algiers in 1984 and 1985. With the opening up and establishment of the multi-party system in 1989, the RCD (Rally for Culture and Democracy) party was created by Saïd Sadi, at the same time as identity politics and the cultural awakening of the Kabylians were intensifying in reaction to the increasingly hard-line Arabization. In the midst of the civil war, there was an act of massive civil disobedience beginning in September 1994 and lasting the entire school year until mid 1995 where the ten-million strong population of Kabylia conducted a total school boycott, known as the "schoolbag strike". In June and July 1998 the region flared up again after the assassination of protest singer and political activist Lounès Matoub at the same time that a law requiring the use of Arabic in all fields of education entered into force, further worsening tensions.

Following the death in April 2001 of Massinissa Guermah, a young high school student, in police custody, major riots took place, known as the Black Spring, in which 123 people died and some two thousand were wounded as a result of the authorities' violent crackdown. Eventually, the government was compelled to negotiate with the Arouch, a confederation of ancestral local councils over the situation, alongside wider issues such as social justice and the economy, which was deemed by the government as 'regionalist' and dangerous for national unity and cohesion. Nevertheless, Tamazight was recognised in 2002 as a national language of Algeria, and as of 7 February 2016, an official language of the State alongside Arabic.

The Movement for the Autonomy of Kabylie (MAK), founded in June 2001, has called for self-government for the region since 2011. The MAK was renamed as "Mouvement pour l'Autodétermination de la Kabylie" seeking independence from Algeria.

Geography

Main features:
 Greater Kabylia, which runs from Thénia (west) to Bgayet (Bejaia) (east), and from the Mediterranean Sea (north) to the valley of Soummam (south), that is to say, 200 km by 100 km, beginning 50 km from Algiers, the capital of Algeria.
 Lesser Kabylia, comprising Kabylia of Bibans and Kabylia of Babors.

Three large chains of mountains occupy most of the area:
 In the north, the mountain range of maritime Kabylia, culminating with Tifrit n'Ait El Hadj (Tamgout 1278 m)
 In the south, the Djurdjura, dominating the valley of Soummam, culminating with Lalla-Khedidja (2308 m)
 Between the two lies the mountain range of Agawa, which is the most populous and is 800 m high on average. The largest town of Great Kabylia, Tizi Ouzou, lies in that mountain range. At Iraten (formerly "Fort-National" in French occupation), which numbered 28,000 inhabitants in 2001, is the highest urban centre of the area.

Ecology

There are a number of flora and fauna associated with this region. Notable is a population of the endangered primate, Barbary macaque, Macaca sylvanus, whose prehistoric range encompassed a much wider span than the present limited populations in Algeria, Morocco and Gibraltar.

Population

The area is populated by Kabyles, a Berber ethnic group. They speak the Kabyle variety of Berber. Since the Berber Spring in 1980, Kabyles have been at the forefront of the fight for recognition of the Berber language as an official one in Algeria (see Languages of Algeria).

Zawiyas

The Kabylia region is home to dozens of zawiyas affiliated with the Rahmaniyya Sufi brotherhood, including the following:
Zawiya Thaalibia in the Issers.
Zawiyet Sidi Boumerdassi in Tidjelabine.
Zawiyet Sidi Boushaki in Thenia.
Zawiyet Sidi Amar Cherif in Sidi Daoud.
 in Aafir.
 in Beni Amrane.
 in Khemis El-Khechna.
 in Boudouaou.

Economy
The traditional economy of the area is based on arboriculture (orchards, olive trees) and on the craft industry (tapestry or pottery). The mountain and hill farming is gradually giving way to local industry (textile and agro-alimentary).

Today Kabylia is one of the most industrialised parts of Algeria. Kabylia produces less than 15% of Algerian GDP (excluding oil and gas). Industries include: pharmaceutical industry in Bgayet Bejaia, agro-alimentary in Ifri and Akbou, mechanical industry in Tizi Ouzou and other small towns of western Kabylia, and petrochemical industry and oil refining in Bgayet Bejaia.

Bgayet (Bejaia)'s port is the second biggest in Algeria after Algiers, and the 6th largest on the Mediterranean Sea.

Notable people

See also
Kabylia football team

References

External links

 Cg.gov.dz
 Elwatan.com
 Tiziouzou-dz.com
 Wilaya-boumerdes.dz
 Wilayasetif.dz
 jijel-dz.org

 
Cultural regions of Algeria
Natural regions of Africa
Geography of Béjaïa Province
Geography of Boumerdès Province
Geography of Tizi Ouzou Province
Berbers in Algeria
Historical regions in Algeria
Algeria geography articles needing translation from French Wikipedia
 Algeria articles needing expert attention